Hinton East (died 1792) was a Jamaican creole of English parents who was a member of House of Assembly of Jamaica for Kingston. He was also Judge Advocate General and Receiver General of Jamaica.

A slave-owner, he created a private botanic garden at Spring Garden, Gordon Town, Liguanea.

References

Further reading 
 Broughton, Arthur. (1794) Hortus Eastensis: or, a Catalogue of Exotic Plants Cultivated in the Botanic Garden, in the Mountains of Liguanea, in the Island of Jamaica &c. St Jago de la Vega: Alexander Aikman for the House of Assembly.

1792 deaths
Members of the House of Assembly of Jamaica
Receiver Generals of Jamaica
British slave owners
Year of birth missing
18th-century Jamaican lawyers